The first Madhesh Provincial Assembly was elected by the 2017 provincial elections. 107 members were elected to the assembly, 64 of whom were elected through direct elections and 43 of whom were elected through the party list proportional representation system. The term of the assembly started on 4 February 2018 and ended in September 2022. Lalbabu Raut from the People's Socialist Party served as the chief minister during the term of the assembly. Saroj Kumar Yadav served as the speaker of the assembly and Upama Kumari Dev served as the deputy speaker.

The 17 January 2022 session of the assembly endorsed Madhesh Province as the name of the province and set Janakpur as the permanent capital of the province.

Composition

Members

Defections

Changes

See also 

 Madhesh Province
 2017 Nepalese provincial elections

References 

Members of the Provincial Assembly of Madhesh Province